Jim Bianco Live at the Hotel Cafe is a compilation of live songs by recording artist Jim Bianco.  Released in 2003, this album was recorded live at the Hotel Cafe between October 1, 2002 and December 3, 2002 by Brad Gordon.

Track listing
All songs were written by Jim Bianco, except the hidden track "Walk on the Wild Side" written by Lou Reed.
“Broken”–3:43
 “Two Birds”–3:39
 “Cucarachas”–4:32
 “Nowhere”–5:17
 “Forever And A Day”–2:42
 “Distracted”–3:45
 “Southpaw”–3:36
 “'S" (false start)–1:23
 “'S”–4:53
 “Play it One Last Time”–8:20
 (hidden track) "Walk On the Wild Side" (Lou Reed cover)

Personnel
as written in the album notes.
Jim Bianco-hollering, nylon, piano on "'S"
David Sutton-gutbucket
Jason Pipkin-skins
Brad Gordon-clarinets, back-up on "Two Birds" and "Southpaw," ivory on "Nowhere," trumpet on "'S"
Kenny Lyon-peppered electric on "Forever And A Day" and "Play It One Last Time"
Nate Richert-mouth harp
Gary Jules MC poddy mouth
John Wells-sound
Bedard-transport

Additional Production Information
This album was recorded live at the Hotel Cafe between October 1, 2002 and December 3, 2002.  Brad Gordon recorded, mixed, mastered and compiled these tracks.

External links
Official website
Jim Bianco on MySpace
Jim Bianco on Facebook
Jim Bianco on Twitter
Jim Bianco's Youtube Channel

Jim Bianco albums
2003 live albums